Synclinal may refer to:

Syncline, in structural geology, a syncline is a fold, with younger layers closer to the center of the structure.
Synclinal, in alkane stereochemistry, a torsion angle between 30° to 90° and –30° to –90°

See also
Homocline
Newman projection
Detachment fold
Gauche effect